Ferrier is a commune in the Fort-Liberté Arrondissement, in the Nord-Est department of Haiti. It had 14,642 inhabitants as of 2015.

Communal Sections 
The commune consists of one communal section, namely:
 Bas Maribahoux, urban and rural, containing the town of Ferrier

References

Populated places in Nord-Est (department)
Communes of Haiti